Horconcitos   is a corregimiento in San Lorenzo District, Chiriquí Province, Panama. It is the seat of San Lorenzo District. Its population as of 1990 was 865; its population as of 2000 was 886.

References

Corregimientos of Chiriquí Province